Preston bus station is the central bus station in the city of Preston in Lancashire, England. It was built by Ove Arup and Partners in the Brutalist architectural style between 1968 and 1969, to a design by Keith Ingham and Charles Wilson of Building Design Partnership with E. H. Stazicker.

In the 2000s the building was threatened with demolition as part of the City Council's Tithebarn redevelopment project. After two unsuccessful attempts, it was granted Grade II listed building status in September 2013. It was then refurbished and officially re-opened in 2018.

Design
Built in the Brutalist architectural style between 1968 and 1969, designed by Keith Ingham and Charles Wilson of Building Design Partnership with E. H. Stazicker, it had (until 2017) a capacity of 80 double-decker buses, 40 along each side of the building. Some claimed that it was the second largest bus station in Western Europe. Pedestrian access to the bus station was originally through any of three subways, one of which linked directly to the adjacent Guild Hall, while the design also incorporates a multi-storey car park of five floors with space for 1,100 cars. It has been described by the Twentieth Century Society as "one of the most significant Brutalist buildings in the UK".

The building's engineers, Ove Arup and Partners, designed the distinctive curve of the car park balconies "after acceptable finishes to a vertical wall proved too expensive, contributing to the organic, sculptural nature of the building. The edges are functional, too, in that they protect car bumpers from crashing against a vertical wall. The cover balustrade protects passengers from the weather by allowing buses to penetrate beneath the lower parking floor."

Threatened demolition
The building was threatened with demolition as part of the City Council's Tithebarn redevelopment project. After the Tithebarn development was abandoned, there were still proposals to demolish the bus station and replace it with a small interchange near the railway station.

In 2000, opposition to demolition led to a failed application for listed building status by English Heritage. Preston Borough Council (as it was then known) opposed the application.

Putting forward the case for a smaller terminus, a report, commissioned by the council and Grosvenor in 2000, stated that "buses arriving and leaving the bus station have very low bus occupancy rates indicating that passengers alight and board elsewhere in the town centre. The bus station car park similarly suffers from the poor pedestrian linkages." Listing was subsequently rejected.

A survey conducted by the Lancashire Evening Post in May 2010 found that Preston Bus Station was Preston people's favourite building.

A further application to list the bus station was rejected in 2010  and a review of the decision was turned down in 2011. It featured on the 2012 World Monument Fund's list of sites at risk.

In 2012, John Wilson of Fulwood in Preston and a member of the "Save Preston Bus Station" campaign presented a petition of 1435 signatures to Preston City Council calling for a referendum on the future of the bus station and argued that 80% of Preston people surveyed supported keeping the bus station and investing in it. Councillors voted to reject a referendum, with only 1 councillor, Terry Cartwright of Deepdale ward voting in favour.

On 7 December 2012, Preston City Council announced that the bus station would be demolished. They said that it would cost £23m to refurbish it and more than £5m just to keep it standing; although they also conceded that demolition would cost an estimated £1.8m. The Twentieth Century Society, which opposed the scheme, stated that a fraction of this amount would maintain the building while proposals to retain it were being worked up.

In 2013, listed building status was applied for again by The Twentieth Century Society and this time it was granted Grade II listed building status.

Refurbishment

In October 2014, the Lancashire County Council announced plans for a £23m renovation of the bus station, including "Youth zone" facilities for young people, along with a new public square on the western side of the building to improve public access to and from Fishergate, St John's Shopping Centre and the Preston Guild Hall.

The council announced an international competition for the design of the new bus station, to be run by the Royal Institute of British Architects (RIBA), and the selection criteria would include a public vote. Over 90 entries were received and short-listed to five finalists, with more than 4,200 members of the public voting for their favourite design. In August 2015, New York-based (with offices in London) architecture company John Puttick Associates' entry was chosen as the winning design. Preston-based architecture group Cassidy + Ashton, who finished a close second (just four points behind the winner), were named as a partner on the project.

While the "Youth Zone" was later cancelled, refurbishment work for the bus station commenced in 2016. In 2017 bus stands 1–40 on the western side were closed, and stands 41–80 on the eastern side were renumbered 1–40. The station was officially re-opened in 2018, although the works continued. In March 2019, the second and final stage of the project saw the construction of a public square in place of the western bus stands commence, with work completed late that year.

50th anniversary

In March 2019 the Preston City Council announced a series of events would take place in the summer and autumn to celebrate the bus station's 50th anniversary. An exhibit Beautiful and Brutal was held at the Harris Museum from 21 September–24 November 2019, and the public were asked to submit relevant photographs and personal memorabilia, some of which were also displayed at the bus station.

On Saturday 19 October 2019, almost 50 years to the day since its opening on 12 October 1969, festivities were held on the new public square in front of the bus station, which included free public entertainment and three historic buses were provided by the Ribble Vehicle Preservation Trust "so the three main users of the bus station were represented".

Awards
In May 2019 the bus station's refurbishment project received three Royal Institute of British Architects (RIBA) North West regional awards:
 The project won the overall Regional Award
 Project consultants John Puttich Associates and Cassidy+Ashton won the Conservation Award
 The Lancashire County Council won the Client of the Year Award

As a regional winner, the bus station was also a nominee for and won a RIBA National Award and received long-listing for the 2019 RIBA Stirling Prize but did not make the short list.

Media appearances
The bus station featured in a song on the children's show All Over the Place.

On Good Friday 2012, it was the venue for the Preston Passion, a passion play involving thousands of people forming a "human cross", broadcast live on BBC Television.

The bus station was featured in a two-part television series by Jonathan Meades, Bunkers, Brutalism, Bloodymindedness: Concrete Poetry (2014).

It is the subject of 56,000, a short film by Paul Adams and Andrew Wilson.

It was used as a filming location for scenes in the film Ip Man 4: The Finale (2019).

The station was the subject of a collection of publications by Craig Atkinson of Café Royal Books, which were put together as a set to celebrate the 50th anniversary of the opening of the station.

See also
Listed buildings in Preston, Lancashire

References

External links

 
 http://www.michaelmackenzie.co.uk - Series titled last bus - New images of Preston bus station
 Lee Garland Photography shots of Preston Bus Station, Sept 07
 Website to save Preston bus station
 Lego version of Preston Bus Station which was featured on BBC News
 Feature on BBC News Lancashire
Photographic Project of Preston Bus Station
 56,000 A short film about Preston Bus Station
"Preston Bus Station: Architectural History, Politics and Democracy in a Post-World War II Designation Saga", Fabrications (2018)

Buildings and structures in Preston
Bus stations in Lancashire
Brutalist architecture in England
Transport in Preston
Grade II listed buildings in Lancashire
Building Design Partnership buildings
1969 establishments in England
Buildings and structures completed in 1969